Pseudoradiarctia parva is a moth in the family Erebidae. It was described by Patrick G. Haynes in 2011. It is found in Tanzania and Zambia.

References

Moths described in 2011
Spilosomina